Solomon Telingater (1903 – 1969) was a Soviet graphic artist, illustrator, printer, typographer, and book designer.

Solomon Telingater was born in Tbilisi in present-day Georgia in 1903 and moved to Baku in present-day Azerbaijan in 1910.

Along with Gustav Klutsis, Alexander Rodchenko, El Lissitzky, and others, Telingater was a founding member of the October group, a collective of Constructivist artists formed in 1928.

See also
 List of Soviet poster artists
 Constructivism (art)
 Photomontage

References

External links

 The Museum of Modern Art
 BlouinArt Info

Soviet illustrators
Soviet avant-garde
Soviet artists
1903 births
1969 deaths
Artists from Baku